Mecca and the Soul Brother is the 1992 debut album from hip-hop duo Pete Rock & CL Smooth. The album contains their best known song, "They Reminisce Over You (T.R.O.Y.)". Mecca and the Soul Brother has been widely acclaimed as one of the greatest hip hop albums of all time. The album was mostly produced by Pete Rock and executive produced by DJ Eddie F of Heavy D & the Boyz (co-group member with Trouble T-Roy).

Background 
Mecca and the Soul Brother followed on the heels of the duo's EP; All Souled Out, released in 1991. Despite being a critical success, it had little commercial success in comparison to other noteworthy releases of 1992, such as Dr. Dre's The Chronic. The first single, "They Reminisce Over You (T.R.O.Y.)", a dedication to their deceased friend; Trouble T Roy (a dance member of Heavy D. & The Boyz), has gone on to become not only their signature song, but also one of hip hop's most highly regarded songs.

Other topics on the album range from life in the ghetto ("Ghettos of the Mind"), the teachings of the Nation of Islam ("Anger in the Nation"), bootlegging ("Straighten It Out"), and love ("Lots of Lovin'").

Reception 
 

Mecca and the Soul Brother brought considerable acclaim to the duo. They were often compared to the group Gang Starr, which also featured one MC, and a producer/DJ. Although the album garnered a great amount of acclaim, sales were slow. The group only grew more popular, however, and next appeared on the Menace II Society soundtrack, followed by Who's the Man? and Poetic Justice respectively, before returning in 1994 with The Main Ingredient.

Accolades 
The information is taken from AcclaimedMusic.net. and other website links below.

Track listing 
All tracks produced by Pete Rock & CL Smooth, except #4 co-produced by Nevelle Hodge and #5 co-produced by Large Professor.

Notes
The cassette and 2xLP versions contain two bonus tracks: "The Creator (Remix)" and "Mecca and the Soul Brother (Remix)"
(*) Symbolizes co-producer

Album singles 
{| class="wikitable"
|-
! Single information
|-
|"They Reminisce Over You (T.R.O.Y.)"
Released: 1992
B-side: "The Creator"
|-
|"Straighten It Out"
Released: 1992
B-side: "They Reminisce Over You (T.R.O.Y.) (Remix)"
|-
|"Lots of Lovin"
Released: February 1993
B-side: "It's Not A Game"
|}

 Chart history 

 Album 

 Singles 

 In popular culture 
The first single "They Reminisce Over You (T.R.O.Y.)" appeared in the 2003 video game NBA Street Vol. 2, the 2011 video game Madden NFL 12 and NBA 2K18, as well as in the Netflix series Master of None. All of the episode titles of the season 2 of Luke Cage are titles of songs from this album. The song "Soul Brother #1" appeared in the video game Tony Hawk's Underground 2.

 References 

 External links 
 Mecca and the Soul Brother'' at Discogs
 Classic Material: The Hip-Hop Album Guide – Mecca and the Soul Brother — By Oliver Wang

1992 albums
Pete Rock & CL Smooth albums
Elektra Records albums
Albums produced by Pete Rock
Albums produced by Large Professor
Albums recorded at Greene St. Recording